The Digital Signature Act 1997, is a Malaysian law enacted to make provision for, and to regulate the use of, digital signatures and to provide for matters connected therewith.

Structure
The Digital Signature Act 1997, in its current form (1 January 2006), consists of 7 Parts containing 92 sections and no schedule (including 1 amendment).
Part I: Preliminary
Part II: The Commission and the Licensing of Certification Authorities
Part III: Requirements of Licensed Certification Authorities
Part IV: Duties of Licensed Certification Authorities and Subscibers
Chapter 1—General requirements for licensed certification authorities
Chapter 2—Warrants and obligation of licensed certification authorities
Chapter 3—Representation and duties upon acceptance or certificate
Chapter 4—Control in private key
Chapter 5—Suspension of certificate
Chapter 6—Revocation of certificate
Chapter 7—Expiration of certificate
Chapter 8—Recommended reliance limits and liability
Part V: Effect of Digital Signature
Part VI: Repositories and Date/Time Stamp Services
Part VII: General

References

External links
 Digital Signature Act 1997 

1997 in Malaysian law
Malaysian federal legislation